Vice Admiral Scott Allen Fry (born Bellefonte, Pennsylvania), is a former Director of the Joint Staff for the United States Department of Defense, who previously served as commander of the Sixth Fleet.

Naval career
Fry attended public schools in Dallas, Pennsylvania, and entered the United States Naval Academy in Annapolis, Maryland, in 1967. Upon graduation, Fry was commissioned as a naval officer in June 1971.

From August 1978, to March 1980, he served on the staff of commander, Destroyer Squadron Four in Charleston, South Carolina. From March, 1980, to March, 1983, Fry was assigned to the Bureau of Naval Personnel, serving as Cruiser/Destroyer Atlantic Fleet Placement Officer and Assistant Surface Captain Detailer. From August 1983, until July 1985 he returned to serve aboard the McCloy as commanding officer. From August, 1985, to May 1986, he served as the Third Battalion Officer, stationed at the United States Naval Academy, in Annapolis, Maryland, then served as executive assistant to the superintendent of the academy, until September, 1988.

From July, 1992, through September, 1993, he was the Commander of Destroyer Squadron 32. By October 1993, Fry returned to Naples, becoming the executive assistant to the Commander in Chief, U.S. Naval Forces Europe/Allied Forces Southern Europe.

Flag rank
In April, 1994, he returned to Washington, D.C., as executive assistant to the Chief of Naval Operations.  From June, 1995 to July, 1997, he served as deputy director for strategy and policy, as a joint staff officer.

In August, 1997, Fry returned to sea as commander of Cruiser-Destroyer Group 8,  Battle Group, leading a Mediterranean/Persian Gulf deployment from June 1998 until that November, when he became director for operations, Joint Staff.

Fry's final assignment, as commander of Naval Striking and Support Forces Southern Europe, began in October, 2001, shortly after the September 11, 2001 attacks. He retired from active duty in 2003.

He is married, and he and his wife have three daughters, three grandsons, and two granddaughters.

Awards and decorations

References

 DTIC.mil (pdf) – Chairman of the Joint Chiefs of Staff Instruction: Aircraft Piracy (Highjacking) and Destruction of Airborne Objects (CJCSI 3610.01A), Vice Admiral Scott A. Fry, Director Joint Chief of Staff (June 1, 2001)
 DTIC.mil – Department of Defence Directive: Military assistance to Civil Authorities' (DODD 3025.15), Secretary of Defence John P. White (February 18, 1997)

External links

 PStripes.osd.mil – Vice Admiral Johnson chosen to head forces in Europe (announces Scott A. Fry replaces Johnson as NATO Commander for Southern Europe), Ward Sanderson (October 4, 2001)

Biographical information
 DD979.com – Vice Admiral Scott A. Fry, U.S. Navy, Commander Naval Striking and Support Forces Southern Europe (biographical info)
 NDU.edu – Vice Admiral Fry
 NATO.int – Commander, Naval Striking and Support Forces Southern Europe (COMSTRIKEFORSOUTH): Vice Admiral Scott A. Fry, U.S. Navy' (August 18, 2003)

1949 births
Living people
People from Bellefonte, Pennsylvania
United States Naval Academy alumni
United States Navy vice admirals
Recipients of the Legion of Merit
Recipients of the Defense Superior Service Medal
Recipients of the Defense Distinguished Service Medal
Military personnel from Pennsylvania